is a Japanese race walker. He has enjoyed success at University and regional levels, having won two bronze medals at both the Summer Universiade (2005, 2007) and the Asian Games (2006, 2010). Morioka has competed at the four World Championships in Athletics (2005 to 2011) and has twice represented Japan at the Summer Olympics (2008, 2012). He also won a silver medal at the 2009 East Asian Games.

He walked an Asian record of 39:07.84 minutes for the 10,000 km track walk in 2010, which was broken two years later by Wang Zhen.  He also set a new personal best at the 2012 Summer Olympics.

Competition record

References

1985 births
Living people
Japanese male racewalkers
Olympic male racewalkers
Olympic athletes of Japan
Athletes (track and field) at the 2008 Summer Olympics
Athletes (track and field) at the 2012 Summer Olympics
Athletes (track and field) at the 2016 Summer Olympics
Asian Games bronze medalists for Japan
Asian Games medalists in athletics (track and field)
Athletes (track and field) at the 2010 Asian Games
Athletes (track and field) at the 2006 Asian Games
Medalists at the 2006 Asian Games
Medalists at the 2010 Asian Games
Universiade bronze medalists for Japan
Universiade medalists in athletics (track and field)
Japan Championships in Athletics winners
Fujitsu people
20th-century Japanese people
21st-century Japanese people